Yanzhou or Yan Prefecture was a zhou (prefecture) in imperial China centering on modern Yanzhou District, Jining, Shandong, China. It existed (intermittently) until 1385, when the Ming dynasty created Yanzhou Prefecture.

Yan Prefecture was named after Yan Province, one of the Nine Provinces of ancient China. The modern district of Yanzhou District retains its name.

Geography
The administrative region of Yan Prefecture in the Tang dynasty is in modern central Shandong. It probably includes parts of modern: 
Under the administration of Jining:
Jining
Qufu
Zoucheng
Wenshang County
Sishui County
Under the administration of Tai'an:
Tai'an
Ningyang County
Under the administration of Laiwu:
Laiwu

References
 

Prefectures of the Sui dynasty
Prefectures of the Tang dynasty
Prefectures of the Song dynasty
Prefectures of Later Liang (Five Dynasties)
Prefectures of Later Han (Five Dynasties)
Prefectures of Later Jin (Five Dynasties)
Prefectures of Later Tang
Prefectures of Later Zhou
Prefectures of the Jin dynasty (1115–1234)
Prefectures of the Yuan dynasty
Subprefectures of the Ming dynasty
Former prefectures in Shandong
Jining